Grob may refer to:
 Grob Aerospace, a German aircraft manufacturer
 Grob fragmentation, an elimination reaction between an electrofuge and nucleofuge on an aliphatic chain
 GrOb or Grazhdanskaya Oborona, a Russian punk band

People with the surname
 Charles Grob, professor of psychiatry
 Connie Grob (1932-1997), American baseball player
 Henri Grob (1904–1974), Swiss chess master
 Jakob Grob (born 1939), Swiss rower
 Jeffrey S. Grob, American Roman Catholic bishop
 Konrad Grob (1828–1904), Swiss painter
 Therese Grob (1798–1875), first love of Franz Schubert

See also
 Chorvátsky Grob, a village and municipality in western Slovakia in Senec District in the Bratislava region
 Slovenský Grob, a village and municipality in western Slovakia in Pezinok District in the Bratislava region
 Veľký Grob, a village and municipality in Galanta District of the Trnava Region of south-west Slovakia
 Grob's Attack, an opening in Chess
 Gertrude Grob-Prandl (born 1917), Wagnerian soprano from Vienna

German-language surnames